Michael Ross Latter (born 5 June 1982) is an Australian politician who was the Liberal National Party of Queensland member for Waterford from 2012 to 2015.

References

Liberal National Party of Queensland politicians
1982 births
Living people
Members of the Queensland Legislative Assembly
21st-century Australian politicians